Dimple Kapadia is an Indian actress who predominantly appears in Hindi films. She was discovered by Raj Kapoor at age 14, who gave her the title role in his teen romance Bobby (1973), opposite his son Rishi Kapoor. The film became a massive commercial success and made her an overnight star. Her role as a Christian teenager from Goa established her as a youth fashion icon and won her the Filmfare Award for Best Actress. Kapadia retired from acting following her marriage to Indian actor Rajesh Khanna earlier in 1973, and returned to the film industry in 1984, after her separation from Khanna. The release of her comeback film, Saagar, was delayed, with Zakhmi Sher becoming the second film of her career. Released in 1985, Saagar earned her a second Best Actress award at Filmfare, and she went on to establish herself as one of the leading actresses of Hindi cinema in the 1980s and early 1990s. The early roles she played following her return included the Hitchcockian thriller Aitbaar (1985), for which she received positive reviews, and the commercially successful action films Arjun (1985) and Janbaaz (1986). During this period, she acted in several films in South India, which she admitted to having made for financial gain and dismissed their quality.

Many of Kapadia's early roles relied on her perceived beauty, and she would struggle to be taken seriously as an actress. She made a decision to accept more serious roles, and won acclaim for her role in the marital drama Kaash (1987). Financial success came with films like Insaniyat Ke Dushman (1987), Insaaf (1987), in which she played double roles; the controversial revenge saga Zakhmi Aurat (1988), in which she played an avenging rape victim; and Ram Lakhan (1989). She started the next decade by venturing into neorealist art films, known in India as parallel cinema, including Drishti (1990), Lekin... (1990), and Rudaali (1993). All these films won her critical praise, and her role as a professional mourner in the latter earned her a National Film Award for Best Actress and a Filmfare Critics Award for Best Actress. She further essayed character parts in Prahaar (1991), Angaar (1992), Gardish (1993), and Krantiveer (1994), which garnered her a fourth Filmfare Award, in the Best Supporting Actress category.

Kapadia became selective about her roles, and her work over the following decades was infrequent, with substantial gaps. She played the supporting part of a divorced alcoholic in Dil Chahta Hai (2001) and was noted for her portrayal of the title role, a middle-aged professor, in the American production Leela (2002). In both films, she played women who are the object of younger men's desire, in roles written especially for her. Some of her later film credits include leading roles in Hum Kaun Hai? (2004), Pyaar Mein Twist (2005), Phir Kabhi (2008), Tum Milo Toh Sahi (2010), and her supporting roles included Being Cyrus (2005), Luck by Chance (2009), Dabangg (2010), Cocktail (2012) and Finding Fanny (2014). While Dabangg was one of the highest-grossing Hindi films of all-time, her roles in Luck by Chance and Finding Fanny earned her two Filmfare nominations. Kapadia was cast by Christopher Nolan in his action thriller Tenet, which was the fourth-highest grossing film of 2020 and earned her positive reviews.

Film

Television

Footnotes

References

Bibliography

External links
 

Indian filmographies
Actress filmographies